Ingunn Arnórsdóttir (12th century;;), was an Icelandic scholar. She belonged to the Ásbirningar family clan and was the daughter of Arnór Ásbjarnarson and sister of Kolbeinn Arnórsson. She was the first of her gender to receive a formal academic education and to serve as a teacher.

Ingunn Arnórsdóttir was a student at the Latin school of Bishop Jón Ögmundsson (reign 1106–1121) at Hólar. She was the only female student at the school and the first woman on Iceland to study Latin and academic subjects and to receive a formal education. After having completed her studies, she became a teacher at the school. She was to have been the teacher of many famous Icelandic men, among them two who later became bishops.

References

 Zoe Patrice Borovsky, Rocking the Boat: Women in Old Norse Literature, 1994

12th-century Icelandic people
11th-century births
12th-century births
Year of death unknown
12th-century Icelandic women